John Frederick Herman (April 11, 1889 – February 1950) was a farmer and political figure in Saskatchewan. He represented Melville from 1938 to 1944 in the Legislative Assembly of Saskatchewan as a Social Credit member.

He was born in Bradford, Ontario, the son of Frederick William Herman and Sarah Etta Roach, and was educated in Severn Bridge, Ontario, in Moosomin, Saskatchewan and in Regina. Herman taught school in Saskatchewan for several years. In 1922, he married Eva Chilcott. He was an unsuccessful Farmer-Labour candidate for the Moosomin seat in the provincial assembly in 1934 and for the Qu'Appelle seat in the Canadian House of Commons running as a CCF candidate the following year. Herman lived in Rocanville. He did not run for reelection to the provincial assembly in 1944.

Electoral record

References 

Social Credit Party of Saskatchewan MLAs
1889 births
1950 deaths
Canadian schoolteachers
Politicians from Regina, Saskatchewan
Co-operative Commonwealth Federation candidates for the Canadian House of Commons